Bobrovo is a rural locality (a settlement) and the administrative center of Bobrovo-Lyavlenskoye Rural Settlement of Primorsky District, Arkhangelsk Oblast, Russia. The population was 1,139 as of 2010. There are 22 streets.

Geography 
Bobrovo is located 41 km southeast of Arkhangelsk (the district's administrative centre) by road. Bobrovo (village) is the nearest rural locality.

References 

Rural localities in Primorsky District, Arkhangelsk Oblast